Lysogorsky (masculine), Lysogorskaya (feminine), or Lysogorskoye (neuter) is the name of several rural localities in Russia:
Lysogorsky, Stavropol Krai, a khutor in Perevalnensky Selsoviet of Mineralovodsky District of Stavropol Krai
Lysogorsky, Ulyanovsk Oblast, a settlement in Podkurovsky Rural Okrug of Terengulsky District of Ulyanovsk Oblast
Lysogorsky, Volgograd Oblast, a khutor in Bubnovsky Selsoviet of Uryupinsky District of Volgograd Oblast
Lysogorskaya, a stanitsa in Georgiyevsky District of Stavropol Krai